is a double a-side maxi single released by Maximum the Hormone on June 23, 2004.

Track listing
 "Rock Bankurawase" (ロック番狂わせ Rock upset) - 2:18
 "Minoreba Rock" (ミノレバ☆ロック ☆ Rock Minoreba) - 3:54
 "W.H.U. (Washikate Honma wa Uretainjai)" (W×H×U×～ワシかてホンマは売れたいんじゃい～ W x H x U x ~ Really Well In to what they sold - Eagle) - 3:07
 "R.H.C.P. ga Boku wo Sarai ni Yatte Kita" (R.H.C.P.が僕をさらいにやってきた R.H.C.P. I came to kidnap me)(Bonus Track) - 0:35

Trivia
The single is released with a 'mystery' 2nd disc; a DVD. There are 4 available, one for each band member. All of the clips featured on the DVDs have been compiled as a special feature on Maximum the Hormone's 1st DVD; Debu Vs Debu.

2004 singles
Maximum the Hormone songs
2004 songs